Bagh-e Vazir (also Romanized as Bāgh-e Vazīr, Bāgh-i-wazīr, and Bāgh Vazīr; also known as Badvazyr’) is a village in Mishu-e Jonubi Rural District, Sufian District, Shabestar County, East Azerbaijan Province, Iran. At the 2006 census, its population was 610, in 147 families.

References 

Populated places in Shabestar County